The William Boyd House, also known as All Bright Hill, is a  double-pen house in Franklin, Tennessee, United States.

The W.A. Boyd farm was one of the largest farms or plantations in Williamson County both before and after the American Civil War.  After the war, many of these were reduced in size, but the Boyd farm, which included the Boyd Mill and the William Boyd House had .  The house was of log cabin type but was expanded with a two-story colonnade.

The house was listed on the National Register of Historic Places in 1988.

This house is one of five log buildings built during 1798 to 1800, during the earliest settling of the area, which survive to today.  Others, also NRHP-listed, are: the William Ogilvie House, the David McEwen House, the Daniel McMahan House, and the Andrew Crockett House.

See also
 Boyd-Wilson Farm

References

Double pen architecture
Houses completed in 1800
Houses on the National Register of Historic Places in Tennessee
Houses in Franklin, Tennessee
National Register of Historic Places in Williamson County, Tennessee